David Alexander Antonites (born ) is a South African rugby union player that played first class rugby for  and the  in 2016. His regular position is lock.

References

South African rugby union players
Living people
1991 births
Rugby union players from Johannesburg
Rugby union locks
Eastern Province Elephants players
Griquas (rugby union) players